Abu al-Qasim Abbas ibn Firnas ibn Wirdas al-Takurini (c. 809/810 – 887 A.D.), also known as Abbas ibn Firnas, Latinized Armen Firman, was a Berber Andalusian polymath: an inventor, astronomer, physicist, chemist, mathematician engineer, Andalusi musician, and Arabic-language poet. He was reported to have experimented with a form of flight.

Ibn Firnas made various contributions in the field of astronomy and engineering. He constructed a device which indicated the motion of the planets and stars in the Universe. In addition, ibn Firnas came up with a procedure to manufacture colourless glass and made magnifying lenses for reading, which were known as reading stones.

Origin 
Abbas ibn Firnas was born in Ronda in the Takurunna province from Berber parents and lived in Córdoba.

Work 
Abbas Ibn Firnas devised a means of manufacturing colorless glass, invented various glass planispheres, made corrective lenses ("reading stones"), devised a chain of things that could be used to simulate the motions of the planets and stars, and developed a process for cutting rock crystal that allowed Spain to cease exporting quartz to Egypt to be cut. He introduced the Sindhind to al-Andalus, which had important influence on astronomy in Europe. He also designed the al-Maqata, a water clock.

Aviation 
Some seven centuries after the death of Firnas, the Algerian historian Ahmed Mohammed al-Maqqari (d. 1632) wrote a description of Firnas that included the following:

Al-Maqqari is said to have used in his history works "many early sources no longer extant", but in the case of Firnas, he does not cite his sources for the details of the reputed flight, though he does claim that one verse in a ninth-century Arab poem is actually an allusion to Firnas's flight. The poem was written by Mu'min ibn Said, a court poet of Córdoba under Muhammad I (d. 886), who was acquainted with and usually critical of Ibn Firnas. The pertinent verse runs: "He flew faster than the phoenix in his flight when he dressed his body in the feathers of a vulture." No other surviving sources refer to the event.

It has been suggested that Ibn Firnas's attempt at glider flight might have inspired the attempt by Eilmer of Malmesbury between 1000 and 1010 in England, but there is no evidence supporting this hypothesis.

Armen Firman 
Armen Firman is the Latinized name of Abbas Ibn Firnas.

According to some secondary sources, about 20 years before Ibn Firnas attempted to fly he may have witnessed Firman as he wrapped himself in a loose cloak stiffened with wooden struts and jumped from a tower in Córdoba, intending to use the garment as wings on which he could glide. The alleged attempt at flight was unsuccessful, but the garment slowed his fall enough that he sustained only  minor injuries.

However, there is no reference to Armen Firman in other secondary sources, all of which deal exhaustively with Ibn Firnas' flight attempt. Armen Firman is not mentioned in al-Maqqari's account.

As this story was recorded only in a single primary source, al-Maqqari, and since Firman's jump is said to have been Ibn Firnas' source of inspiration, the lack of any mention of Firman in al-Maqqari's account may point to synthesis, the tower jump later confused with Ibn Firnas' gliding attempt in secondary writings.

Legacy 
In 1973, a statue of Ibn Firnas by the sculptor Badri al-Samarrai was installed at the Baghdad International Airport in Iraq.
In 1976, the International Astronomical Union (IAU) approved of naming a crater on the moon after him as Ibn Firnas. In 2011, one of the bridges going over the Guadalquivir river in Córdoba, Spain, was named the "Abbas Ibn Firnás Bridge". A British one-plane airline, Firnas Airways, was also named after him.

See also 

Hezârfen Ahmed Çelebi
History of aviation
Ismail ibn Hammad al-Jawhari
Lagâri Hasan Çelebi
List of inventions in the medieval Islamic world
Timeline of science and technology in the Islamic world

References

Sources 
 J. Vernet, Abbas Ibn Firnas. Dictionary of Scientific Biography (C.C. Gilespie, ed.) Vol. I, New York: Charles Scribner's Sons, 1970–1980. pg. 5.
Lynn Townsend White Jr. (Spring, 1961). "Eilmer of Malmesbury, an Eleventh Century Aviator: A Case Study of Technological Innovation, Its Context and Tradition", Technology and Culture 2 (2), p. 97–111 [100f.], .
 Salim T.S. Al-Hassani (ed.), Elisabeth Woodcock (au.), and Rabah Saoud (au.). 2006. 1001 Inventions. Muslim Heritage in Our World. Manchester: Foundation for Science, Technology and Civilisation. See pages 308–313.

Further reading 

9th-century births
887 deaths
9th-century people from al-Andalus
9th-century Berber people
Alchemists of the medieval Islamic world
Aviation pioneers
Berber clockmakers
Berber scientists
Berber poets
Inventors of the medieval Islamic world
Technology in the medieval Islamic world
Physicians from al-Andalus
People from Ronda
9th-century inventors
Artificial wings